Marvin Harvey may refer to:

 Marvin Harvey (American football) (born 1959), American football player
 Marvin Harvey (basketball) (born 1954), American basketball player